This is a list of notable foods of the Southern United States. The cuisine of the Southern United States has many various dishes and foods.

Beverages 

 Alabama Slammer—a cocktail made with amaretto, Southern Comfort, sloe gin, and orange juice, served in a Collins glass
 Ale-8-One—made in Winchester, Kentucky
 Barq's Root Beer—first made in Biloxi, Mississippi
 Big Red—cream soda originally from Waco, Texas
 Blenheim Ginger Ale
 Bourbon—made in central Kentucky
 Brownie Chocolate Drink
 Buffalo Rock ginger ale
 Buttermilk
 Cheerwine—a North Carolina-based cherry flavored drink
 Coca-Cola—first made in Atlanta
 Double Cola—based in Chattanooga, Tennessee; also produces Ski soda
 Dr. Enuf—available in eastern Tennessee
 Dr Pepper—a popular drink in Texas before achieving national popularity
 Grapette—grape soda first made in 1939 in Camden, Arkansas; currently available exclusively at Wal-Mart stores nationwide
 Grapico—grape soda made by Buffalo Rock
 Hurricane Punch
 Lemonade
 Mello Yello—a lemon-lime soda product of the Coca-Cola Company, sold primarily in the South
 Mint julep—associated with the Kentucky Derby and The Great Gatsby
 Mountain Dew—originally made in Knoxville, Tennessee
 Muscadine wine and juice—usually homemade, though also commercially available from some regional vineyards
 Nehi soda—produced by RC Cola, including grape, peach, and orange flavors
 Orange juice from Florida
 Pepsi Cola—first made in New Bern, North Carolina
 RC Cola—first made in Columbus, Georgia
 Red Rock Cola—invented in Atlanta in 1885, predating Coca-Cola
 Rum—several small-batch varieties, primarily in and around New Orleans
 Sassafras tea
 Sazerac cocktail
 Slurpee—frozen drink sold by 7-Eleven originally of Dallas, Texas
 Southern Comfort—New Orleans-based neutral spirit, with sweeteners and peach flavor added
 Sun Drop—citrus drink found in northern Alabama, central Tennessee, the Carolinas, western Kentucky, southeastern Missouri, and parts of Virginia
 Sunny Delight (SunnyD)—invented in Mount Dora, Florida in 1964
 Sugarcane juice
 Sweet tea—usually served with ice, lemon, and sugar, sometimes with mint
 Tennessee whiskey—Jack Daniel's and George Dickel are the two remaining brands

Breads 

 Banana nut bread
 Cuban bread
 Biscuits—traditionally prepared with buttermilk
 Corn pone—also called hoecake, Johnny cake
 Cornbread—corn meal, wheat flour, milk, buttermilk or water, leavening, sometimes oil and usually egg; may be sweet or savory
 Cracklin' cornbread—has pork cracklins in it
 Hush puppies
 Gingerbread—known in some parts of the deep south as molasses bread
 Cornmeal mush—also known as coush coush in the Deep South
 Pumpkin bread
 Spoonbread—a traditional colonial dish
 Yeast rolls
 Zucchini bread

Desserts and sweets

Cakes 

 Baltimore peach cake
 Butter pecan cake 
 Caramel cake
 Coconut cake
 Doberge cake
 Fruit cake
 Hummingbird cake
 Italian cream cake
 Jelly cake
 King cake
 Lady Baltimore cake
 Lane cake
 Moravian sugar cake
 Peach shortcake
 Pig pickin' cake—usually made with boxed yellow cake mix infused with canned mandarin oranges; frosted with a whipped topping, vanilla pudding and coconut icing
 Pound cake
 Red velvet cake
 Stack cake–usually five or more layers with chocolate or apple butter filling
 Strawberry shortcake
 Tipsy cake

Candies 

 Beens seed candy—such as Benne Brittle, found primarily in the coastal regions of Georgia and South Carolina
 Bourbon balls
 Divinity
 Goo Goo Cluster
 Haystacks
 Kentucky cream candy—a pulled candy that is prepared with cream;  usually made during the colder months (40 deg or below) of the year when humidity is low
 Modjeska
 Moon pie
 Peanut brittle
 Pecan brittle
 Pecan Divinity
 Pralines—a specialty of New Orleans

Cobblers 

 Apple Brown Betty—a traditional colonial dessert
 Blackberry cobbler
 Dewberry cobbler
 Peach cobbler
 Sweet potato sonker

Cookies 
 Butter pecan cookie
 Chocolate chip cookies
 Moravian spice cookies—especially in North Carolina and Virginia
 Oatmeal cookie
 Peanut butter cookie
 Tea cakes

Frozen 

 Bananas Foster
 Blackberry ice cream
 Creole cream cheese ice cream
 Peach ice cream
 Pecan-praline ice cream
 Snow cone
 Strawberry ice cream

Pies 

 Apple pie
 Black bottom pie
 Blueberry pie
 Buttermilk pie
 Chess pie
 Coconut chess pie
 Blackberry pie—from the native blackberry ripening in early summer
 Grape hull pie—scuppernong or muscadine grape pie
 Jefferson Davis pie—a molasses pie containing dates
 Key lime pie
 Lemon ice box pie
 Lemon Meringue Pie
 Millionaire pie
 Mississippi mud pie
 Peanut pie
 Pecan pie—made with any variety of pecan, an elegant rendition of the dessert often served in Florida and Georgia uses the plump, perfectly round Elliot Pecan
 Shoofly pie—found in parts of the South where Pennsylvania Dutch settled, such as the valleys of Virginia
 Squash pie
 Strawberry pie
 Sweet potato pie

Puddings 

 Banana pudding
 Bread pudding
 Chocolate pudding
 Corn pudding
 Grits pudding
 Indian pudding
 Lemon pudding
 Persimmon pudding
 Sweet potato dumplings
 Sweet potato pudding
 Trifle

Pastries 
 Cream puff
 Hand pie—biscuit or pie pastry filled usually filled with cooked dried apples, peaches and cherries, either baked or fried
 Fritters—apple, peach, or sweet potato

Meats, poultry and seafood 

 Alligator meat—typically served fried
 Barbecue—usually pork or beef, but also chicken; seasoning and preparation vary greatly within the region, though most commonly pork-based in areas east of Texas
 Beef brisket—popular especially in Texas
 Boucherie—a style of barbecue common to Cajuns in South Louisiana where the pig is eaten snout to tail
 Bull roast—barbecue where the head and feet of an entire bull are removed and the whole thing is slowly barbecued on a spit over hot coals; native to Maryland
 Pork ribs—may be prepared "wet" or "dry" style
 Pulled pork—popular in Tennessee, North Carolina, South Carolina and Virginia
 Pulled pork sandwich—a slow-cooked chopped, pork shoulder sandwich topped with crispy coleslaw or red slaw (the latter for "Lexington-style" North Carolina barbecue
 Beaver tail stew—consumed in Arkansas
 Boudin—a spicy sausage, with rice as a central filler, from Cajun Louisiana
 Chicken and dumplings
 Chicken fried steak
 Chicken gizzards—fried
 Chitlins (chitterlings)—small intestine of a hog
 Chitlins and maw
 Country captain
 Crab cake—popular along the Chesapeake Bay (Maryland and Virginia), where the crab cake is typically not dredged in bread crumbs, and in Louisiana, where it typically is
 Crawfish—also called crawdad, crayfish
 Fried chicken—usually flour-battered and pan-fried
 Hot chicken—a spicy variant of fried chicken coated in lard and pepper
 Fried fish and seafood—battered or dredged in cornmeal then pan fried or deep fried
 Calabash-style seafood—popular in the coastal Carolinas
 Catfish—usually fried, whole or fillets
 Mullet—fried, extremely popular in the Florida panhandle
 Fried pork chops
 Fried turkey—deep fried using an outdoor frier
 Game meat—venison, rabbit, and game fowl are most common, but opossum, squirrel, and raccoon also may be eaten, especially in more remote areas
 Grits and grillades—a Louisiana brunch staple
 Ham—usually pan fried, roasted, or smoked; varieties include "sugar-cured" or "country" (salt-cured)
 Ham hocks
 Hot hamburger plate—a slice of white bread topped with a hamburger patty, French fries and gravy
 Jambalaya
 Liver—usually pan-fried pork or chicken liver, but also beef
 Livermush
 Lobster—typically only eaten in Florida where the Caribbean Spiny Lobster and the Caribbean lobster are native; these may be split and seasoned with piquant spices before being grilled
 Moravian chicken pie—a traditional dish from the Piedmont region of North Carolina
 Oyster stew—often eaten on Christmas Eve
 Quail
 Raccoon meat
 Reptiles and amphibians—most notably alligator and frog legs, eaten in much of the South
 Salmon croquettes
 Shrimp and grits
 Shrimp Creole
 Stuffed ham—a specialty in Southern Maryland
 Smithfield ham—a specialty of Smithfield, Virginia
 Souse meat—also called head cheese
 Squirrel meat
 Hot links

Side dishes and condiments 

 Apple butter
 Barbecue sauce—numerous varieties throughout the region, sometimes even within same state; most use a primarily vinegar, tomato, or mustard base
Barbecue spaghetti
 Cane syrup
 Cayenne peppers
 Chow-chow
 Cole slaw—cabbage salad/relish, typically made with mayonnaise and sometimes sugar, except in parts of North Carolina and Virginia, where it instead may be vinegar-based and savory  ("barbecue slaw")
 Cornbread dressing—similar to traditional stuffing, but using cornbread as a base and prepared separately from the meat
 Cracklin'—fried pork rind
 Deviled eggs
Goober peas
 Gravy-served liberally over meats, potatoes, biscuits and rice
 Chocolate gravy—made with milk, fat, flour, cocoa powder, and sugar, served over biscuits
 Red-eye gravy—made with black coffee and meat drippings (usually ham), typically served with country ham and grits
 Sausage gravy—milk-based country gravy typically served over hot biscuits
 Tomato gravy—canned tomato-based, made in a cast-iron skillet with browned flour, served over rice
 Grits
 Cheese grits
 Fried grits
 Hot sauce
 Tabasco sauce—trademarked, aged hot sauce made in Louisiana
 Texas Pete—hot sauce made in Winston-Salem, North Carolina

 Macaroni and cheese—usually prepared with fresh eggs and baked en casserole
 Mayhaw jelly
 Muscadine jelly
 Old Bay Seasoning—made famous in Maryland
 Peanut butter
 Pepper jelly
 Plantains
 Pickle relish—usually used to make potato salad
 Pickled or brandied peaches
 Rice
 Red rice
 Sorghum molasses
 Watermelon rind pickles

Soups, stews and boils 

 Brunswick stew—originated in either Virginia or Georgia
 Burgoo—served at barbecues in western and central Kentucky, similar to Brunswick stew
 Chicken sauce-picquante—chicken cooked in a tangy stew with tomatoes and spices, often served over rice, a favorite in southern Louisiana
 Conch chowder—mainly a specialty of Florida
 Étouffée—a very thick stew made of crawfish or chicken and sausage, okra and roux served over rice
 Gumbo—made with seafood or meat and okra; a Cajun/Creole delicacy
 Hoppin' John
 Low-country boil—any of several varieties
 Frogmore stew—made with sausage, corn, crabs, and shrimp; popular in coastal South Carolina
 Seafood muddle
 Peanut soup—one of the oldest dishes consumed in the South, brought by Africans, mainly a dish of Virginia
 Pilau—any number of dishes which combine rice stewed with meat and vegetables to serve with. Most popular being the chicken bog. (These dishes are popular in South Carolina due to the influence of rice cultivation on the history of South Carolina)
 She-crab soup—mainly served in the area around Charleston, South Carolina and Savannah, Georgia from Atlantic crabs
 Tomato soup—stewed tomatoes, okra and corn
 Turtle soup—mainly a Creole dish in Louisiana
 Terrapin stew—a historical dish of Atlantic Coast states such as Maryland and Virginia

Vegetables and salads 

 Ambrosia
 Beans—often cooked down with chunks of ham, bacon grease, or onions
 Baked beans
 Butter or lima beans
 Green beans
 Pinto beans and cornbread
 Pole beans
 White or great northern beans
 Greens—seasoned with some kind of meat or meat grease. The liquid left after cooking is known as pot liquor. 
 Collard greens
 Creasy greens
 Kale
 Mustard greens
 Poke salad—cooked pokeweed
 Turnip greens
 Carrots—often "candied" with butter and brown sugar
 Carrot raisin salad
 Congealed salad
 Corn
 Corn fritters
 Corn on the cob—boiled, steamed, or grilled; usually served with butter or mayonnaise
 Corn pudding
 Creamed corn
 Shoepeg corn
 Hoppin' John—a traditional Low-Country dish of black-eyed peas served with rice

 Mashed potatoes—called "creamed" in some regions
 Rutmus—potatoes boiled and mashed with turnip bottoms and butter
 Okra—flour-battered and pan-fried or boiled, stewed, or steamed
 Onion—sliced Vidalia onion, whole green onion, onion rings
 Peas—often cooked with chunks of ham or onions
 Black-eyed peas
 Crowder peas
 Field peas
 Purple hull peas
 Potato salad—usually made in the South with egg, mayonnaise, prepared mustard and pickle relish
 Ramp—wild leeks popular in the Appalachian mountains

 Red beans and rice—slow cooked, spicy kidney beans, served over white long grain rice, most often with a spicy sausage on top or incorporated
 Seven-layer salad
 Succotash
 Summer squash—dredged in a mixture of cornmeal and flour and fried crisp with a light to medium browning, prepared en casserole, or made into pickles
 Swamp cabbage—heart of palm
 Tomatoes—sliced ripe, also eaten at breakfast
 Fried green tomatoes
 Sweet potatoes—often "candied" with butter and brown sugar 
 Tomato aspic
 Vidalia onion—a sweet onion grown only in the state of Georgia, sold and popular throughout the South
 Wilted lettuce—with dressing, an Appalachian speciality

Miscellaneous 

 Beer cheese
 Boiled peanuts
 Chicken salad
 Confederate cush
 Creole cream cheese
 Fatback or hog jowl
 Frito pie
 Hoop cheese
 Muffuletta sandwich
 Palmetto Cheese—a brand of pimento cheese from Pawleys Island, South Carolina
 Peanut butter and banana sandwich
 Peanuts in Cola
 Pickled pigs feet
 Pimento cheese sandwich
 Po' boy sandwich
 Vienna sausages

See also
 List of soul foods and dishes
 Louisiana Creole cuisine

References 

 
Southern United States